This is a list of diplomatic missions of Rwanda, excluding honorary consulates.

Africa

Americas

Asia

Europe

Multilateral organizations

Gallery

See also
 Foreign relations of Rwanda
 List of diplomatic missions in Rwanda
 Visa policy of Rwanda

References

Ministry of Foreign Affairs of Rwanda

Rwanda
Diplomatic missions